Clara Haskil (7 January 1895 – 7 December 1960) was a Romanian classical pianist, renowned as an interpreter of the classical and early romantic repertoire. She was particularly noted for her performances and recordings of Mozart. She was also a noted interpreter of Beethoven, Schumann, and Scarlatti.

Biography
Haskil was born into a Jewish family in Bucharest, Romania. Her father Isaac Haskil (1858–1899) immigrated to Romania from Bessarabia (then part of the Russian Empire); he died from acute pneumonia when Clara was only 4 years old. Her mother Berthe Haskil (née Moscona) (1866–1917), of Sephardi origin, was one of six children of David Moscona and Rebecca Aladjem. The Moscona family dates back to 1300s Spain, having fled persecution during the Spanish Inquisition and settling first in Ottoman Turkey and later in Bulgaria. Haskil studied in Vienna under Richard Robert (whose pupils also included Rudolf Serkin and George Szell) and briefly with Ferruccio Busoni. She later moved to France, where she studied with Gabriel Fauré's pupil Joseph Morpain, whom she always credited as one of her greatest influences. The same year she entered the Conservatoire de Paris, officially to study with Alfred Cortot although most of her instruction came from Lazare Lévy and Mme Giraud-Latarse, and graduated at age 15 with a Premier Prix. Upon graduating, Haskil began to tour Europe, though her career was cut short by one of the numerous physical ailments she suffered throughout her life. In 1913 she was fitted with a plaster cast in an attempt to halt the progression of scoliosis. Frequent illnesses, combined with extreme stage fright that appeared in 1920, kept her from critical or financial success. Most of her life was spent in abject poverty. It was only after World War II, during a series of concerts in the Netherlands in 1949, that she began to win acclaim. In 1951 she moved to Vevey in Switzerland. Not long after that she was appointed a Chevalier of the Légion d’Honneur by the French state.

As a pianist, her playing was marked by a purity of tone and phrasing that may have come from her skill as a violinist. Transparency and sensitive inspiration were other hallmarks of her style.

Well regarded as a chamber musician, Haskil collaborated with George Enescu, Eugène Ysaÿe, Pablo Casals, Dinu Lipatti, Joseph Szigeti, Géza Anda, Isaac Stern, Henryk Szeryng and Arthur Grumiaux, with whom she played her last concert. While renowned primarily as a violinist, Grumiaux was also a fine pianist, and he and Haskil would sometimes swap instruments.

She played as a soloist under the baton of many conductors, including Ansermet, Barbirolli, Baumgartner, Beecham, Boult, Celibidache, Cluytens, Dixon, Fricsay, Giulini, Hindemith, Inghelbrecht, Jochum, Karajan, Kempe, Klemperer, Kubelík, Markevitch, Monteux, Munch, Paray, Rosbaud, Sawallisch, Solti, Stokowski and Szell.

One of her most famous recordings as a soloist with orchestra is of Mozart's Piano Concertos No. 20 in D minor, K. 466 and No. 24 in C minor, K. 491, made in November 1960 with the Orchestre Lamoureux conducted by Igor Markevitch (issued on CD by Philips Classics under No. 464 718-2; reissued under No. 478 479-9; and included in Clara Haskil Edition Box Set Decca 478 254-1) highly lyrical and yet, in some way, vigorous playing of K. 491's second movement.

Haskil died from injuries received in a fall on a staircase  at the Brussels-South railway station. She was due to play at a concert with Arthur Grumiaux the following day. She was aged 65.

An esteemed friend of Haskil, Charlie Chaplin, described her talent by saying "In my lifetime I have met three geniuses; Professor Einstein, Winston Churchill, and Clara Haskil. I am not a trained musician but I can only say that her touch was exquisite, her expression wonderful, and her technique extraordinary."

In a 2013 interview, Pope Francis mentioned Haskil as one of his favorite musicians, especially when performing Mozart.

In August 2017 was released Clara Haskil, le mystère de l'interprète, documentary of 70 minutes by Pascal Cling, Prune Jaillet and Pierre-Olivier François.

Prix Clara Haskil 
The Clara Haskil International Piano Competition is held biennially in her memory. The brochure reads: "The Clara Haskil Competition was founded in 1963 to honour and perpetuate the memory of the incomparable Swiss pianist, of Romanian origin, who was born in Bucharest in 1895. It takes place every two years in Vevey, Switzerland, where Clara Haskil resided from 1942 until her death in Brussels in 1960. A street in Vevey bears her name. The competition welcomes young pianists from all over the world, who pursue the musical ideal that is inspired by Clara Haskil and which will always remain exemplary."

References

External links 

 The Prix Clara Haskil, the prize given in her memory
 "Clara Haskil", Dictionnaire Historique de la Suisse
 "The Perfect Clara Haskil" by Peter Feuchtwanger, September 2000, about his first encounter with the art of Clara Haskil
 Biography and portraits of Clara Haskil at Bach-Cantatas.com
 Clara Haskil Edition at Decca
 Clara Haskil portrait at Naxos

1895 births
1960 deaths
Accidental deaths from falls
20th-century Romanian musicians
20th-century classical pianists
Romanian classical pianists
Romanian women pianists
Jewish classical pianists
Deutsche Grammophon artists
Romanian Sephardi Jews
20th-century Sephardi Jews
Romanian expatriates in Austria
Romanian expatriates in France
Romanian expatriates in Switzerland
Romanian people of Russian descent
Romanian people of Turkish descent
People who lost Romanian citizenship
Musicians from Bucharest
Burials at Montparnasse Cemetery
Women classical pianists
Decca Records artists
Naxos Records artists
Music & Arts artists
20th-century women pianists